Gottfried von Cramm and Hilde Sperling were the defending champions, but lost in the third round to Ian Collins and Gwyn Corbett, Lady Rowallan.

Ryuki Miki and Dorothy Round defeated Bunny Austin and Dorothy Shepherd-Barron in the final, 7–5, 8–6 to win the mixed doubles tennis title at the 1934 Wimbledon Championships.

Seeds

  Gottfried von Cramm /  Hilde Sperling (third round)
  George Lott /  Sarah Palfrey (quarterfinals)
  Enrique Maier /  Elizabeth Ryan (second round)
  Jean Borotra /  Betty Nuthall (first round)

Draw

Finals

Top half

Section 1

Section 2

Section 3

The nationality of GE Bean is unknown.

Section 4

The nationality of Mrs F von Rohrer is unknown.

Bottom half

Section 5

Section 6

Section 7

Section 8

References

External links

X=Mixed Doubles
Wimbledon Championship by year – Mixed doubles